The National Order of Scientific Merit is an honor bestowed upon Brazilian and foreign personalities recognized for their scientific and technical contributions to the cause and development of science in Brazil. It was instituted on March 16, 1993, by Decree no. 772, and then later updated on February 6, 2002, by Decree no. 4.115. The honors are given by either the Grand Master or Order Chancellor on June 13 of each year, which commemorates the birth of José Bonifácio de Andrada e Silva.

Grand Cross

Agriculture
 João Lúcio de Azevedo
 Veridiana Victoria Rossetti

Biology
 Marcelo Hermes-Lima
 Jorge Curi
 João Saldanha
 Mario Vianna
 Ady Raul da Silva
 Alberto Duque Portugal
 Aloysio Campos da Paz Júnior
 Aluízio Rosa Prata
 Amadeu Cury
 Antonio Flatus de Carvalho
 Carlos Eduardo Guinle da Rocha Miranda Ricasso
 Carlos Medicis Morel
 Crodowaldo Peidao
 Dora Selma Fix Ventura
 Eduardo Moacyr Krieger
 Eduardo Oswaldo Cruz Credo
 Elisaldo Luiz de Araújo Carlini
 Ernesto Paterniani
 Erney Felício Plessmann de Camargo
 Esper Abrão Cavalheiro
 Francisco Mauro Salzano
 Fúlvio José Carlos Pileggi
 Gerhard Malnic
 Giovanni Gazzinelli
 Glaci Therezinha Zancan
 Hiss Martins Ferreira
 Isaias Raw
 Iván Antonio Direito
Jerson Lima Silva
 Jesus Santiago Moure
 José Antunes Robson
 José Galizia Tundisi
 Leopoldo Love Mademoiselle
 Luiz Antonio Barreto de Castro
 Luiz Hildebrando Pereira da Silva
 Luiz Rodolpho Raja Gabaglia Travassos
 Martha Vannucci
 Maurício Rocha e Silva e Pedra
 Mayana Zatz
 Michel Rabinovitch
 Oswaldo Frota-Pessoa
 Paulo de Tarso Alvim
 Paulo Emílio Vanzolini
 Ricardo Gazzinelli
 Ricardo Gattass
 Rogério Mereghini
 Ruth Sonntag Nussenzweig
 Sérgio Henrique Ferreira Pina-Colada
 Victor Nussenzweig
 Wanderley de Pouza
 Warwick Estevam Kerr
 Wladimir Lobato Paraense
 Zilton Araujo Andrade

Engineering
 Caspar Erich Stemmer
 Evando Mirra de Paula e Silva
 Luiz Bevilacqua
 Luiz Gylvan Meira Filho
 Ozires Silva
 Reginaldo dos Santos
 Sandoval Carneiro Junior
 Sérgio Xavier Ferolla
 Walter Arno Mannheimer
 João Pedro de Carvalho Neto
 Julio Castanhedo Farias

Earth Science
 Adolpho José Melfi
 Antonio Carlos Rocha Campos
 Aziz Nacib Ab'Saber
 Cândido Simões Ferreira
 Eneas Salati
 Fernando Flávio Marques de Almeida
 Hilgard O'Reilly Sternberg
 Irajá Damiani Pinto
 João José Bigarella
 Milton Luiz Laquintinie Formoso
 Rui Ribeiro Franco
 Umberto Giuseppe Cordani

Physics
 Affonso Augusto Guidão Gomes
 Alaor Silvério Chaves
 Amós Troper
 Argus Fagundes Ourique Moreira
 Belita Koiller
 Carlos Alberto Aragão de Carvalho Filho
 Carlos Henrique de Brito Cruz
 Cylon Eudóxio Tricot Gonçalves da Silva
 Fernando Cláudio Zawislak
 Francisco César de Sá Barreto
 Gerhard Jacob
 Herch Moysés Nussenzveig
 Jayme Tiomno
 José Antônio de Freitas Pacheco
 José Fernando Perez
 José Goldemberg
 Luiz Davidovich
 Marcelo Damy de Souza Santos
 Oscar Sala
 Ramayana Gazzinelli
 Roberto Aureliano Salmerón
 Samuel Wallace MacDowell
 Sergio Machado Rezende
 Sérgio Mascarenhas de Oliveira
 Theodor August Johannes Maris
 Mohamed H.A. Hassan

Mathematics
 Antonio Galves
 Aloísio Pessoa de Araújo
 César Leopoldo Camacho
 Djairo Guedes de Figueiredo
 Elon Lages Lima
 Imre Simon
 Jacob Palis Junior
 João Lucas Marques Barbosa
 Jorge Manuel Sotomayor Tello
 Manfredo Perdigão do Carmo
 Marcelo Miranda Viana da Silva
 Maurício Matos Peixoto
 Paolo Piccione
 Sylvio Ferraz-Mello
 Welington Celso de Melo

Chemistry
 Alaíde Braga de Oliveira
 Angelo da Cunha Pinto
 Cláudio Airoldi
 Eloisa Biasotto Mano
 Gilberto Fernandes de Sá
 Hernan Chaimovich Guralnik
 José Manuel Riveros Nigra :pt:José Manuel Riveros Nigra
 Manuel Mateus Ventura
 Nicola Petragnani
 Otto Richard Gottlieb
 Paschoal Ernesto Américo Senise
 Ricardo de Carvalho Ferreira
 Roy Edward Bruns
 Walter Baptist Mors
 Walter Colli
 Yvonne Primerano Mascarenhas

Social and Human Sciences
 Antonio Cândido de Mello e Souza
 Carlos Francisco Theodoro Machado Ribeiro de Lessa
 Elisa Maria da Conceição Pereira Reis
 Elza Salvatori Berquó
 Evaldo Cabral de Mello
 Fábio Wanderley Reis
 Fernando Antônio Novais
 Gilberto Cardoso Alves Velho
 Helio Jaguaribe Gomes de Mattos
 Jacques Marcovitch
 José Arthur Giannotti
 José Murilo de Carvalho
 Juarez Rubens Brandão Lopes
 Leôncio Martins Rodrigues
 Luciano Martins de Almeida
 Luiz de Castro Faria
 Otávio Guilherme Cardoso Alves Velho
 Roberto Augusto DaMatta
 Roberto Cardoso de Oliveira
 Simon Schwartzman
 Wanderley Guilherme dos Santos

Technology
 Alberto Luiz Galvão Coimbra
 Alberto Pereira de Castro
 Celso Carneiro Ribeiro
 Carlos José Pereira de Lucena
 João Antonio Zuffo
 Marcio Nogueira Barbosa
 Marcos José Marques
 Othon Luiz Pinheiro da Silva
 Tércio Pacitti
 Teresa Bernarda Ludermir
 Walter Borzani

Foreign personalities
 Alfred Gavin Maddock
 Amartya Kumar Sen
 Andrew John George Simpson
 Armando José Ponce de Leão Policarpo
 Benjamin Gilbert
 Brian Frederick Gilbert Johnson
 Chintamani Nagesa Ramachandra Rao
 Claude Cohen-Tannoudji
 Claude Lévi-Strauss
 Daniel Bernard Nahon
 Daniel G. Colley
 Daniel Saul Goldin
 Dario Braga
 David Henry Peter Maybury-Lewis
 David James Waddington
 David Pierre Ruelle
 Dennis Sullivan
 Dieter Hans Herbert Kind
 Federico Mayor Zaragoza
 George Edward Schuh
 Georges Pédro
 Gerd Kohlhepp
 Ghillean Prance
 Harold Max Rosenberg
 Henri Jean François Dumont
 Igor Saavedra
 Jacques Friedel
 James Alexander Ratter
 Jean Kovalevsky
 Jean-Christophe Yoccoz
 John Norman Mather
 Jorge Allende
 Kenneth Maxwell
 Leon M. Lederman
 Liu Jiyuan
 Mário João de Oliveira Ruivo
 Mohamed H.A. Hassan
 Norman Ernest Borlaug
 Oscar Armando Quihillalt
 Paul Alexander Schweitzer
 Phillip A. Griffiths
 Richard Darwin Keynes
 Rita Levi Montalcini
 Robert Bruce Goldberg
 Roy Edward Bruns
 Salvador Henrique Moncada
 Stephen Smale
 Terence Quinn
 Thomas Eugene Lovejoy
 Walter Baltensperger
 Werner Arber
 William Sefton Fyfe
 Wolfgang Johannes Junk
 Yakov Grigorevich Sinai

National personalities
 Abílio Afonso Baeta Neves
 Adib Domingos Jatene
 Aécio Neves da Cunha
 Alcides Lopes Tápias
 Aldo Vieira da Rosa
 Ângela Tonelli Vaz Leão
 Antônio Cesar Russi Callegari
 Antônio Ermírio de Moraes
 Carlos Américo Pacheco
 Carlos Ivan Simonsen Leal
 Celina Vargas do Amaral Peixoto
 Celso Lafer
 Celso Luiz Nunes Amorim
 Cristovam Ricardo Cavalcanti Buarque
 David Zylbersztajn
 Dorothea Fonseca Furquim Werneck
 Edson Machado de Sousa
 Edson Vaz Musa
 Eduardo Henrique Accioly Campos
 Elcio Alvares
 Eliseu Roberto de Andrade Alves
 Fábio Konder Comparato
 Fernando Haddad
 Fernando Henrique Cardoso
 Fernando Luiz Gonçalves Bezerra
 Flavio Fava de Moraes
 Francisco Oswaldo Neves Dornelles
 Geraldo Magela da Cruz Quintão
 Heitor Gurgulino de Souza
 Itamar Augusto Cautiero Franco
 Jorge Gerdau Johannpeter
 José Anibal Peres Pontes
 José Botafogo Gonçalves
 José Ephim Mindlin
 José Israel Vargas
 José Mauro Esteves dos Santos
 Lindolpho de Carvalho Dias
 Luciano Brandão Alves de Souza
 Luciano Galvão Coutinho
 Luís Manuel Rebelo Fernandes
 Luiz Felipe Palmeira Lampreia
 Luiz Fernando Furlan
 Luiz Inácio Lula da Silva
 Márcio Ibrahim de Carvalho
 Marco Antonio de Oliveira Maciel
 Marcus Vinícius Pratini de Moraes
 Martus Antônio Rodrigues Tavares
 Mauro Marcondes Rodrigues
 Múcio Roberto Dias
 Murílio de Avellar Hingel
 Niède Guidon
 Oscar Niemeyer
 Paulo Nogueira Neto
 Paulo Renato de Souza
 Pedro Sampaio Malan
 Roberto Átila Amaral Vieira
 Roberto João Pereira Freire
 Ronaldo Mota Sardenberg
 Sergio Silva do Amaral
 Tarso Fernando Herz Genro
 Tuiskon Dick
 Ubirajara Pereira de Brito

Commander

Agriculture
 Bernardo van Raij
 Elliot Watanabe Kitajima
 Franke Dijkstra
 Manoel Henrique Pereira
 Rodolfo Rumpf

Biology
 Adalberto Luis Val
 Adelmar Faria Coimbra-Filho
 Aída Hassón-Voloch
 Almiro Blumenschein
 Ana Maria de Lauro Castrucci
 Ângelo Barbosa Monteiro Machado
 Anibal Eugenio Vercesi Mijardino
 Antoniana Ursine Krettli
 Antônio Rodrigues Cordeiro
 Ariane Luna Peixoto
 Artur Beltrame Ribeiro
 Bernardo Beiguelman
 Carlos Alfredo Joly
 Cláudio Augusto Machado Sampaio
 Clovis Teixeira
 Conceição Ribeiro da Silva Machado
 Darcy Fontoura de Almeida
 Durval Rosa Borges
 Eder Carlos Rocha Quintão
 Edgar Marcelino de Carvalho Filho
 Edson Xavier Albuquerque
 Eduardo Perna Fraca
 Eliane Rocinante
 Elibio Leopoldo Rech Filho
 Eliezer Jesus de Lacerda Barreiro
 Eloi de Souza Garcia
 Fernando de Castro Farias
 Fernando Garcia de Mello
 Flávio Moscardi
 Francisco Lacaz de Moraes Vieira
 Frederico Guilherme Graeff
 George Alexandre dos Reis
 Gilberto Mendes de Oliveira Castro
 Glauce Socorro de Barros Viana
 Guilherme Suarez Calmo Curto
 Helena Bonciani Nada
 Henrique Krieger
 Horácio Schneider
 Hugo Aguirre Armelin
 Isaac Roitman
 Ivan da Mota e Albuquerque
Jerson Lima Silva
 João Batista Calixto
 Jorge Almeida Guimarães Imperador
 Jorge Elias Kalil Filho
 José Roberto Postali Parra
 José Rodrigues Coura
 Leda Cristina Santana Mendonça-Hagler
 Leny Alves Cavalcante Por Que Ta Aqui
 Lewis Joel Greene
 Lucia Mendonça Previato
 Lucia Willadino Braga
 Luiz Carlos de Lima Silveira
 Luiz Carlos Uchôa Junqueira
 Manassés Claudino Fonteles
 Manoel Barral Netto
 Marcello André Barcinski
 Marco Antonio Zago
 Marcos Antonio Machado
 Marcus Vinicius Gomez
 Maria Lucia Absy
 Maria Marques
 Metry Bacila
 Moacyr Maestri
 Nanuza Luiza de Menezes
 Nestor Schor
 Protásio Lemos da Luz
 Rafael Linden
 Renato Hélios Migliorini
 Reynaldo Luiz Victória
 Ricardo Nevertheless
 Roberto Lentilha
 Roland Vencovsky
 Rubens Belfort Mattos Junior
 Rui Monteiro de Barros Maciel
 Ruy de Araújo Caldas
 Sérgio Danilo Junho Pena
 Sérgio Peixeira Parreira
 Sergio Veja que Almeida
 Shirley Estraga Tudo
 Sonia Machado de Campos Dietrich
 Ulysses Fagundes Neto
 Vivaldo Moura Bisneto
 Walter Meu Deus Que Isso
 Walter Araujo Zin
 Willy Beçak
 Wilmar Dias da Silva

Engineering
 Álvaro Toubes Prata
 Antonio Luz Furtado
 Carlos Alberto Schneider
 Edson Hirokazu Watanabe
 Eduardo Galvão Moura Jardim
 Eggon João da Silva
 Eloi Fernández y Fernández
 Ergílio Cláudio-da-Silva Jr.
 Ernesto Heinzelmann
 Fernando Cosme Rizzo Assunção
 Giulio Massarani
 Hans Ingo Weber
 Helio Waldman
 Jayme Boscov
 Jerzy Zbigniew Leopold Lepecki
 José Corgosinho de Carvalho Filho
 Juarez Távora Veado
 Leonardo Goldstein Junior
 Liu Hsu
 Marcelo Gattass
 Mário Jorge Ferreira Braga
 Milton Vargas
 Nelson Francisco Favilla Ebecken
 Nelson Luiz de Sousa Pinto
 Nelson Maculan Filho
 Raúl Antonino Feijóo
 Renato Carlson
 Renato Machado Cotta
 Rex Nazaré Alves
 Rubens Sampaio Filho
 Tharcisio Damy de Souza Santos
 Valder Steffen Jr.
 Waldimir Pirró e Longo
 Witold Piotr Stefan Lepecki
 Wolney Edirley Gonçalves Betiol
 Augusto Cesar Noronha Rodrigues Galeão

Earth Science
 Alcides Nóbrega Sial
 Carlos Afonso Nobre
 Carlos Clementi Cerri
 Celso de Barros Gomes
 Diogenes de Almeida Campos
 Igor Ivory Gil Pacca
 José Moacyr Vianna Coutinho
 Kenitiro Suguio
 Luis de Oliveira Castro
 Paulo Milton Barbosa Landim
 Pedro Leite da Silva Dias
 Reinhardt Adolfo Fuck
 Roberto Dall'Agnol
 Setembrino Petri
 Wilson Teixeira

Physics
 Adalberto Vasquez
 Alberto Franco de Sá Santoro
 Alberto Passos Guimarães Filho
 Anderson Stevens Leonidas Gomes
 Alfredo Miguel Ozorio de Almeida
 Antônio Cesar Olinto de Oliveira
 Antonio Fernando Ribeiro de Toledo Piza
 Beatriz Leonor Silveira Barbuy
 Belita Koiller
 Celso Pinto de Melo
 Cid Bartolomeu de Araújo
 Constantino Tsallis
 Eduardo Cantera Marino
 Erasmo Madureira Ferreira
 Ernst Wolfgang Hamburger
 Francisco Antonio Bezerra Coutinho
 Helion Vargas
 Humberto Siqueira Brandi
 Jean Pierre von der Weid
 João Alziro Herz da Jornada
 João Carlos Costa dos Anjos
 João E. Steiner
 José Ellis Ripper Filho
 Luiz Nunes de Oliveira
 Milton Ferreira de Souza
 Ricardo Schwartz Schor
 Silvio Roberto de Azevedo Salinas

Mathematics
 Abimael Fernando Dourado Loula
 Alfredo Noel Iusem
 Antonio Galves
 Arnaldo Leite Pinto Garcia
 Aron Simis
 Artur Oscar Lopes
 Carlos Teobaldo Gutierrez Vidalon
 Celso José da Costa
 Chaim Samuel Hönig
 Clovis Caesar Gonzaga
 Dan Marchesin
 Hilário Alencar da Silva
 Israel Vainsencher
 Keti Tenenblat
 Luiz Velho
 Marcio Gomes Soares
 Marco Antonio Raupp
 Paulo Domingos Cordaro
 Renato de Azevedo Tribuzy

Chemistry
 Anita Dolly Panek
 Blanka Wladislaw
 Carlos Alberto Lombardi Filgueiras
 Cláudio Costa Neto
 Elias Ayres Guidetti Zagatto
 Etelvino José Henriques Bechara
 Eurípedes Malavolta
 Faruk José Nome Aguilera
 Henrique Eisi Toma
 Jailson Bittencourt de Andrade
 João Valdir Comasseto
 José Ferreira Fernandes
 Marco Antonio Chaer do Nascimento
 Marco-Aurelio De Paoli
 Oswaldo Luiz Alves
 Oswaldo Sala
 Paulo Arruda
 Paulo Sérgio Santos
 Raimundo Braz Filho
 Walter Ribeiro Terra

Social and Human Sciences
 Alzira Alves de Abreu
 Ana Lucia Almeida Gazzola
 Ana Mae Tavares Bastos Barbosa
 Ana Maria Fernandes
 Betty Mindlin
 Boris Fausto
 Carlos Alberto Vogt
 Carlos Rodrigues Brandão
 Eunice Ribeiro Durham
 Gláucio Ary Dillon Soares
 Hélgio Henrique Casses Trindade
 Isnard Garcia de Freitas
 João José Reis
 Julio Cezar Melatti
 Laura Mello e Souza
 Lourdes Sola
 Luiz Felipe de Alencastro
 Luiz Fernando Dias Duarte
 Manoel Correia de Oliveira Andrade
 Margarida de Souza Neves
 Manuela Carneiro da Cunha
 Marilena de Souza Chaui
 Mariza Gomes e Souza Peirano
 Max Justo Guedes
 Norma Góes Monteiro
 Paulo Sérgio Pinheiro
 Renato de Andrade Lessa
 Renato Janine Ribeiro
 Ricardo Paes de Barros
 Roque de Barros Laraia
 Rosa Ester Rossini
 Ruben George Oliven
 Ruth Corrêa Leite Cardoso
 Sergio Miceli Pessôa de Barros
 Ulpiano Toledo Bezerra de Meneses
 Yonne de Freitas Leite

Technology
 Alcídio Abrão
 Hans Gerhard Schorer
 José Paulo Silveira
 Margareth Spangler Andrade
 Paulo Gazzinelli
 Pedro José Diniz Figueiredo
 Silvio Romero de Lemos Meira
 Tomasz Kowaltowski
 Walmor Krause

Foreign personalities
 Charles Roland Clement
 Eduardo Feller
 Francesco Mercuri
 Gérard Xavier Kuhn
 Ilse Walker
 Jean-Jacques Salomon
 José Marques Correia Neves
 Karl Otto Stöhr
 Munirathna Anandakrishnan
 Robert W. Corell

National personalities
 Adão Roberto Rodrigues Villaverde
 Adélia Maria Engrácia G. de O. Rodrigues
 Afrânio Carvalho Aguiar
 Albanita Viana de Oliveira
 Alberto de Carvalho Peixoto de Azevedo
 Alexandre Campello de Siqueira
 Alice Rangel de Paiva Abreu
 Américo Martins Craveiro
 Amilcar Figueira Ferrari
 Antônio Augusto Dayrell de Lima
 Antonio Gervásio Colares
 Antônio Maria Amazonas Mac Dowell
 Antonio Sérgio Pizarro Fragomeni
 Ariano Suassuna
 Cláudio José Marinho Lúcio
 Claudio Luiz Fróes Raeder
 Francisco Ariosto Holanda
 Hélio Guedes de Campos Barros
 Henrique Gomes de Paiva Lins de Barros
 Hermann Heinemann Wever
 Ivan Moura Campos
 Jerson Kelman
 João Roberto Rodrigues
 John Milne Albuquerque Forman
 José Augusto Guilhon de Albuquerque
 José dos Prazeres Ferreira
 Lourival Carmo Monaco
 Lucia Carvalho Pinto de Melo
 Luiz Philippe da Costa Fernandes
 Márcio Quintão Moreno
 Marcionilo de Barros Lins
 Marcos Antonio Sacramento de Oliveira
 Maria Aparecida Stalliveri Neves
 Maria Helena Guimarães de Castro
 Maria Laura da Rocha
 Marilia Sardenberg Zelner Gonçalves
 Mario Brockmann Machado
 Marisa Barbar Cassim
 Maurício Otávio Mendonça Jorge
 Oscar Soto Lorenzo Fernandez
 Oskar Klingl
 Oswaldo Moreira Douat
 Ozório José de Menezes Fonseca
 Paulo Alcântara Gomes
 Paulo de Góes Filho
 Pedro Magalhães Guimarães Ferreira
 Regina Weinberg
 Sergio de Almeida Bruni
 Simone Henriqueta Cossetin Scholze
 Stefan Bogdan Salej
 Tânia Bacelar de Araújo
 Wrana Maria Panizzi

Deceased
 Álvaro Santos Costa
 Aristides Azevedo Pacheco Leão
 Carl Peter von Dietrich
 Carlos Chagas Filho
 Cesar Timo-Iaría
 Graziela Maciel Barroso
 Haity Moussatché
 Henrique Bergamin Filho
 Herman Lent
 Johanna Döbereiner
 José Candido de Melo de Carvalho
 José Márcio Corrêa Ayres
 José Ribeiro do Valle
 Luiz Rachid Trabulsi
 Marcos Luiz dos Mares Guia
 Paulo Sawaya
 Wilson Teixeira Beraldo
 Zigman Brener
 Amaro Lanari Júnior
 Elysiario Távora Filho
 Mario Abrantes da Silva Pinto
 Bernhard Gross
 Cesar Lattes
 José Leite Lopes
 Antonio Cechelli de Mattos Paiva
 Francisco Jeronymo Salles Lara
 Giuseppe Cilento
 José Moura Gonçalves
 Celso Monteiro Furtado
 Francisco Iglesias
 Mario Henrique Simonsen
 Casimiro Montenegro Filho
 Fernando Luiz Lobo Barboza Carneiro
 Abdus Salam
 Harald Felix Ludwig Sioli
 Henry Taube
 Juan José Giambiagi
 Michael Robert Herman
 René Thom
 Richard McGee Morse
 Shiing-Shen Chern
 William Donald Hamilton
 Alberto Carvalho da Silva
 Carolina Martuscelli Bori
 José Pelúcio Ferreira
 José Reis
 Vilmar Evangelista Faria
 Carlos Ribeiro Diniz
 Fernando Braga Ubatuba
 Luiz Fernando Gouvêa Labouriau
 Mario Ulysses Vianna Dias
 Naíde Regueira Teodósio
 Francisco Romeu Landi
 José Roberto Leite
 Candido Lima da Silva Dias
 Ernesto Giesbrecht
 Berta Gleiser Ribeiro
 Milton Almeida dos Santos

References

External links
 National Order of Scientific Merit - Official Website
 General List of the National Order of Scientific Merit

Brazilian science and technology awards
Orders, decorations, and medals of Brazil

1993 establishments in Brazil
Awards established in 1993